Axel Wilhelm Persson (23 January 1888 – 2 September 1955) was a Swedish cyclist. He competed in the road race at the 1912 and 1920 Summer Olympics and won a gold and a silver medal with the Swedish teams. Individually he finished 9th and 12th, respectively.

Person won nine to eleven Swedish titles on the road and track, both in the sprint and long-distance events. In 1919, he also became Scandinavian champion in the road race.

References

External links

profile

1888 births
1955 deaths
Swedish male cyclists
Cyclists at the 1912 Summer Olympics
Cyclists at the 1920 Summer Olympics
Olympic cyclists of Sweden
Olympic gold medalists for Sweden
Olympic silver medalists for Sweden
Olympic medalists in cycling
People from Eskilstuna
Medalists at the 1912 Summer Olympics
Medalists at the 1920 Summer Olympics
Sportspeople from Södermanland County